Chrząszczewko  is a hamlet on Chrząszczewska Island on Kamieński Lagoon, in north-west Poland. It has a population of 210.

Villages in Kamień County